The Hollie Hughes Stakes is an American Thoroughbred horse race run annually since 1979 at Aqueduct Racetrack in Ozone Park, Queens, New York. A six furlong sprint raced on dirt, it is open to horses bred in the State of New York age four and older. Run in mid February, then in mid January, now returned to the month of February, the race currently offers a purse of $100,000.

The race is named in honor of New York native Hollie Hughes, a U.S. Racing Hall of Fame inductee who trained horses from a New York base for 70 years.

Records
Speed record:
 1:08.60 – Stalwart Member (1997)

Most wins:
 3 – Papua (2003, 2004, 2005)

Most wins by a jockey:
 3 – Junior Alvarado (2011, 2013, 2016)
 3 – Ángel Cordero Jr. (1981, 1983, 1989)
 3 – Richard Migliore (1994, 2003, 2005)

Most wins by a trainer:
 6 – Michael E. Hushion (1998, 2003, 2004, 2005, 2010, 2015)

Most wins by an owner:
 6 – Barry K. Schwartz (1998, 2003, 2004, 2005, 2015, 2020)

Winners

References

Open sprint category horse races
Ungraded stakes races in the United States
Horse races in New York City
Aqueduct Racetrack
Recurring sporting events established in 1979
1979 establishments in New York City